Berbara (also spelled al-Barbara) is a municipality in the Byblos District of  Keserwan-Jbeil Governorate, Lebanon. It is located along the Mediterranean coast, 48 kilometers north of Beirut. Berbara has an average elevation of 200 meters above sea level and a total land area of 314 hectares. Its inhabitants are predominantly Maronite and Greek Orthodox Christians.

References

Populated places in Byblos District
Eastern Orthodox Christian communities in Lebanon
Maronite Christian communities in Lebanon